Kennedy River Bog Provincial Park is a provincial park in British Columbia, Canada, located on the south side of the Kennedy River, downstream from Kennedy Lake.

See also
Clayoquot Sound Biosphere Reserve

References

Clayoquot Sound region
Bogs of Canada
Provincial parks of British Columbia
1995 establishments in British Columbia
Protected areas established in 1995